Asnières-en-Bessin (literally "Asnières in Bessin") is a commune in the Calvados department in the Normandy region of north-western France.

The inhabitants of the commune are known as Asnièrois or Asnièroises.

Geography
Asnières-en-Bessin is located some 17 km west by north-west of Bayeux, 3 km west of Vierville-sur-Mer, and 4 km north by north-east of Longueville. Access to the commune is by the D194 road from Louvières in the east passing through the north of the commune and the village and continuing west to Cricqueville-en-Bessin. The D198 road goes south from the village through the length of the commune and continues to Aignerville. There is the hamlet of Le Temple just south of the village and Montigny in the south of the commune. The commune is entirely farmland.

The Veret river flows through the centre of the commune from east to west and continues west then north-west to the sea at the Pont du Hable.

Administration

List of Successive Mayors

Demography
In 2017 the commune had 65 inhabitants.

Sites and monuments
Château of Asnières-en-Bessin, built in 1693, rebuilt in 1783.

Notable people linked to the commune
Arthur Le Duc (1848-1918), sculptor, was the Mayor of the commune from 1893 to his death in 1918.
Albert Anne (1908-1944), a member of the resistance in the Alliance network, (A resistance network in the interior of France during the Second World War) he was arrested by the Gestapo on 5 May 1944 at Asnières-en-Bessin, where he had used his skills as a forger, and he was executed at Caen jail on 6 June 1944.

See also
Communes of the Calvados department

External links
Asnières-en-Bessin on Géoportail, National Geographic Institute (IGN) website 
Asnieres on the 1750 Cassini Map

References

Communes of Calvados (department)